Stephen Jay Friedman  (March 15, 1937 – October 4, 1996) was an American film producer known for The Last Picture Show (1971) and The Big Easy (1986). In 1980, he formed Kings Road Entertainment—named after the West Hollywood street where he lived—making him one of the first independent film producers to raise substantial film funding through a publicly traded company.

Early life
Born in Brooklyn, New York, Friedman graduated from Midwood High School in Brooklyn, the Wharton School at the University of Pennsylvania and then obtained a law degree at Harvard University. He began his legal career with the Federal Trade Commission, then went to work as an entertainment attorney for Columbia Pictures and Paramount Studios.

Career
Anxious to be a producer, Friedman acquired the film rights to the 1966 novel The Last Picture Show by Larry McMurtry. The film was nominated for eight Oscars, including the Academy Award for Best Picture. Three years later he scripted and produced Lovin' Molly, also adapted from a McMurtry novel, and followed this with producing credits on Slap Shot (1977), Fast Break (1979), Hero at Large (1980), Little Darlings (1980), The Incubus (1981), and Eye of the Needle (1981).

Friedman's first film produced in conjunction with Kings Road Entertainment (formerly Kings Road Productions) was All of Me with Steve Martin and Lily Tomlin. Additional credits at Kings Road include The Best of Times (1986) with Robin Williams and Kurt Russell, The Big Easy (1987, nominated for the Independent Spirit Award for Best Film) with Dennis Quaid and Ellen Barkin, Jacknife (1989) with Robert De Niro and Ed Harris, and Kickboxer (1989) with Jean-Claude Van Damme. His final project was Mother (1995) with Diane Ladd and Olympia Dukakis.

In 1985, Kings Road Entertainment had a production pact with Tri-Star Pictures in order to distribute up to 12 pictures, after a previous contract with Universal Pictures expired. Also that year, he set up a foreign office for Kings Road Entertainment in order to handle in-house productions, as well as acquisitions for the studio, and took over operations for Terry Glinwood.

In 1986, it signed a television pact with ITC Entertainment to handle syndicated rights to then-upcoming theatrical motion pictures that would be handled by the studio for a multi-million dollar agreement. In 1987, Kings Road Entertainment had entered into a partnership with the New Century/Vista Film Corporation, in order to handle distribution of The Big Easy and Morgan Stewart's Coming Home in a twin pack.

That year, Kings Road Entertainment entered into the film distribution business in order to handle six in-house pictures and six acquisitions annually, and hired Leo Greenfield to serve as executive vice president of the studio and president of distribution, and joining Greenfield were Donald Smolen, who was senior vice president of advertising and Henry Seggerman as senior vice president of production and acquisition and the new Kings Road distribution office set up branches in New York, Los Angeles, Dallas and Chicago in anticipation of the company's first pictures they are distributing.

Death
Friedman died of multiple myeloma at home in Brentwood, California at the age of 59.

Selected filmography
He was a producer in all films unless otherwise noted.

Film

As writer

Miscellaneous crew

Thanks

Television

References

External links

Film producers from New York (state)
New York (state) lawyers
American male screenwriters
People from Brooklyn
Wharton School of the University of Pennsylvania alumni
Harvard Law School alumni
Deaths from multiple myeloma
1937 births
1996 deaths
Deaths from cancer in California
20th-century American businesspeople
Screenwriters from New York (state)
20th-century American male writers
20th-century American screenwriters
20th-century American lawyers